is a Japanese animated television series produced by Ashi Productions. It ran on TV Tokyo from June 3, 1987 through December 30, 1987.

Connection to Revenge of Cronos
In the finale of Machine Robo: Revenge of Cronos, the Machine Robo decide to leave planet Cronos after defeating Gandler so that they can fight against evil in a new dimension.  When they cross the dimensional barrier, the Machine Robo appear on Electronic Planet B1 with no memory of events from the previous series.

Story
In the year 406AE, the Electronic Planet B-1 falls prey to the Mechanoid space gang Gurendos. To fight back against them, the Machine Robo join forces to form the Algo Republic. Meanwhile, a large starship with five humans in suspended animation malfunctions and crash lands on B-1. Emerging from their ship, they find themselves caught up in the struggle between the Gurendos forces and the Algo Republic, eventually joining forces with the rough-and-tumble bunch of Machine Robo known as the Battle Hackers team to help save B-1 and eventually find a way back to Earth.  In the final episode it is discovered that the robotic wars of Electronic Planet B1 were created by humans as a testing ground for arms traders.

Characters

Algo Army
RIM (voice: Masako Katsuki)
 The Mother Computer that commands the Algo Army.

Battle Hackers
The most dangerous unit in the Algo Army, it is composed of the misfits, hotheads, and dropouts of the Machine Robo.
R. JeTan (voice: Shin'ya Ōtaki)
The leader of the Battle Hackers.  Like his name suggests, he transforms from robot to jet to tank.  Carries the "R. Bazooka" and sub-rifle.
Garzack (voice: Nobuyuki Furuta)
Non-transforming sub-commander, his weapon is the "Garfire Special".  Although no toy of Garzack was ever released, an electronic prototype was designed that would have interacted with the anime.
Mach Blaster (voice: Issei Futamata)
A triple changer that can go from robot to jet to gun.  Former White Thunder member.
Drill Crusher (voice: Kōichi Yamadera)
"Muscle"-type character.  Can transform from robot to drill-tank to rhinoceros.  Former Silver Wolves member.
Fossil People 
Header, Abarar, Leggar and Taildar combine into Gattai Saurer. Get around on hoverboards.
Pro Truck Racer (voice: Nobuaki Fukuda)
Former Silver Wolves member.  Carries the Big Blazer Cannon.

Wheelmen
Hot Rod Joe
F-1 Jack
Buggy Wolf
Drag Sam
Rotary Kid
Twincam Jimmy

Humans
Akira Amachi (voice: Masaaki Ōkura)
Pilots the Jet Riser
Luke Stewart (voice: Ken'yū Horiuchi)
Pilots the Battle Riser
Mia White (voice: Naoko Matsui)
Pilots the Power Riser
Zen Ogawa (voice: Nozomu Sasaki)
Patricia Longfellow (voice: Yuri Amano)

Winner Robo
Roboshooter Gaiden
Testarossa Winner
Ferrari Testarossa.
Truck Winner
Race truck
Police Winner
Toyota Soarer Patrol Car
Buggy Winner
Hornet Buggy.  Called Dirt Robo in the anime.
F-1 Winner
Lotus F1.  Called Racer Robo in the anime.
Eagle Winner
F-15 Eagle.
Fire Winner
Chemical Fire Engine
Porsche Winner
Porsche 935.

Silver Wolves
The new team name of the Battle Clan from Revenge of Cronos. Composed of the land and sea robots.
Rod Drill (played by Ken'yū Horiuchi)
 Leader of the Silver Wolves. Transforms into a drill-tank. One of his toy molds was used as the Renegade Screw Head in the GoBots series.

White Thunder
Team name of the Jet Clan from Revenge of Cronos. Composed of the aerial robots.
Blue Jet (played by Shinya Ōtaki)
 Leader of the White Thunder. He can turn into a jet. Fights with "Tenkū Shin Ken (天空真剣, Sky True Sword)" style sword. One of his toy molds was used as the Renegade Fitor in the GoBots series.

Blue Dragons
Team name of the Jewel Lords and Rock Lords from Revenge of Cronos.
Dia Man (Solitare) (played by Shō Hayami)
 Leader of the Blue Dragons. Transforms into a diamond.

Red Knights
Team name of the Martial Arts Robo/Cronos Clan from Revenge of Cronos.
Kendo Robo
 Leader of the Red Knights.

Gurendos
The villains of the series.  The group's name derives from the term guren-tai (愚連隊 hoodlums)
Dylan (ディラン総統) (voice: Ryūzaburō Ōtomo, Junichi Kagaya)
An evil computer that controls the Gurendos.
Gakurandar (ガクランダー) (voice: Ken Yamaguchi)
Second-in-command of the Gurendos.  His name is based on gakuran.
Kariagen (カリアゲン)  (voice: Satoru Inagaki)
Kariage (刈り上げ) loosely translates to "hair cropped close in the back".
Sorikondar  (ソリコンダー)  (voice: Minoru Inaba)
Name derived from sorikomi (剃り込み), again referring to his hairstyle.
Yasand  (ヤーサンド)  (voice: Yūji Mikimoto)
A yakuza swordsman.  Rides a Mercedes-Benz. Name derived from Yassan (ヤッサン).
Shibumidas  (シブミダス)  (voice: Ken'ichi Ono)
Named derived from shibumi.
Rikimines  (リキミネス)  (voice: Minoru Inaba)
Suji  (スジ)  (voice: Issei Futamata)
 Sorikondar's aide. Speaks in a Kansai dialect.  Named after the phrase Suji no toranai (筋の通らない illogical)
Iron Eagle  (アイアンイーグル)  (voice: Katsumi Suzuki)
Pattsuri (パッツリ)
Zentry (ゼントリー)
Kizūn (キズーン)
Named derived from kizu (scar).
Gantsuke (ガンツケ)
Shinobis (シノビス)
Named derived from shinobi (ninja).
Igarn (イガーン)
Named derived from Iga, an ancient ninja province.
Geruka (ゲルカ)
Teppodaman (テッポダマン)
Uwappā (ウワッパー)
Sitappā (シタッパー)
Shitappa means "underling".
Bi-Bi-Bi Black (ビビビブラック)
Devil Satan 6 (played by Kenichi Ono)
Six monstrous robots that can combine into the giant Devil Satan 6 robot.  In the anime they are referred to by number instead of name.
 Gillhead (played by Kenichi Ono): The head.  Speaks in a Kansai dialect.
 Barabat: Left arm.
 Deathclaw: Right arm.
 Gurogiron: Torso.
 Eyegos: Right Leg.
 Blugoda: Left Leg.

See also
Machine Robo
Machine Robo: Revenge of Cronos

References

External links
 
 

1987 anime television series debuts
1987 Japanese television series endings
Japanese children's animated action television series
Japanese children's animated adventure television series
Japanese children's animated science fiction television series
Adventure anime and manga
Ashi Productions
Fictional robots
Super robot anime and manga
Television shows based on toys